Nada personal (Nothing Personal) is a Mexican telenovela, which was broadcast in 1996. It was the first produced by Argos Comunicación for TV Azteca and began on May 20 of that year on TV 7. It was the production that put the network on the radar of the television audience in Mexico. It was the first telenovela of Ana Colchero after her leave from Televisa and the first telenovela that discussed political topics. She played the role of Camila but had to be replaced by Christianne Gout when Colchero had issues with the network. It was directed by Antonio Serrano, director of Teresa and the blockbuster film Sexo, pudor y lágrimas.

Plot
Police chief Fernándo Gomez Miranda kills his friend, the well-respected lawyer and likely candidate for Attorney General, Raúl de Los Reyes and his youngest daughter of only thirteen in a vehicle ambush. Gomez' son, Luis Marioa sad-eyed broadcast journalist of passionate convictionarrives on the scene soon after with his camera and discovers a wounded survivor in the car; Camila, the eldest daughter of de Los Reyes.

Luis rushes her to the hospital, saving her life and thereby creating a bond between them that he cannot escape. Luis' half-brother, police detective Alfonso Carbajal, is assigned to the case. An old schoolmate of Camila's, Alfonso has long been in love with her and conflicts arise when all evidence points to Camila being involved in the drug trade. The two brothers find themselves caught between their professional duty that would require them to expose Camila and their desire to protect her.

Standing in their way is Fernando, who is busy fabricating evidence to sink Camila and at the same time taking a very personal interest in Raúl's widow, María Dolores. Each on his own, Alfonso and Luis Mario work to prove Camila's innocence and find the real killer, without knowing that the man they seek is their own father.

The series is based on the life of the former Mexican President (1988–1994) Carlos Salinas de Gortari and his scandalous family story.

Main cast

 José Ángel Llamas as Luis Mario Gómez
 Ana Colchero as Camila de los Reyes (1996–97)
 Christianne Gout as Camila de los Reyes (1997)
 Anna Ciocchetti as Elsa Grajales
 Rogelio Guerra as Comandante Fernando Gómez Miranda 'El Águila Real'
 Lupita Ferrer as María Dolores de los Reyes
 Demián Bichir as Comandante Alfonso Carbajal
 Guillermo Gil as Mateo
 Joaquín Garrido as X
 Vanessa Acosta as Paula
 Martín Altomaro as Próspero aka "Pop"
 Mónica Dionne as Alicia
 Enoc Leaño as "Mandíbulas"
 Claudia Lobo as Alma
 Pilar Ixquic Mata as Rosalba
 Víctor Huggo Martin as Víctor/Hugo
 Loló Navarro as Xóchitl
 María Renée Prudencio as Soraya
 Gloria Peralta as Monica
 Martha Resnikoff as Ester
 Josefo Rodríguez as Esteban
 José Sefami as Marrana
 Lourdes Villareal as Benigna
 Dunia Zaldívar as Amalia
 Claudio Obregón as Raúl de los Reyes
 Gilberto Perez Gallardo as Lucio

Supporting cast

 Carlos Aragón
 Gustavo Arenas
 Arquímides Bernal
 Lorena Caballero
 Patricia Collazo
 Ramón Cue
 Aline Cuevas
 Rodrigo Du Rocher
 Jaime Escageda
 Claudia Frías
 Camerino García
 Alberto Gutiérrez
 Erika de la Llave
 Víctor Manuel Luna
 Mary Paz Mata
 María Elena Olivares
 Ramón Omanana
 Rubén Oviedo
 Leticia Pedrajo
 Agustín Pineda
 Valentina Ponzanneli
 Javier Rives
 Rosa María Salvador
 Laura Sosa
 Adalberto Tellez
 Daniel Valadez
 Simone Victoria
 Daniela Zamorano
 Armando de la Vega

Ratings

References

External links
 Nada personal at the telenovela database
 
 Nada personal at TV Azteca 

1996 telenovelas
1996 Mexican television series debuts
1997 Mexican television series endings
Mexican telenovelas
TV Azteca telenovelas
Spanish-language telenovelas